James L. Williams (born March 6, 1978) is a former American football wide receiver in the National Football League (NFL). He was drafted by the Seattle Seahawks in the sixth round of the 2000 NFL Draft and also played for the Detroit Lions. He played college football at Marshall.

See also 
 List of NCAA major college football yearly receiving leaders

References

External links
Marshall Thunder Herd bio

1978 births
Living people
Sportspeople from Vicksburg, Mississippi
Players of American football from Mississippi
American football wide receivers
American football return specialists
Marshall Thundering Herd football players
Seattle Seahawks players
Detroit Lions players